Rudolph Anders (December 17, 1895 – March 27, 1987) was a German character actor who came to the United States after the rise of Hitler, and appeared in numerous American films in the 1940s, 1950s, and 1960s.

Biography
He was born Rudolf Franz Amendt in Waldkirch, Baden, Germany. In the United States during the 1940s, he used the stage name of Robert O. Davis, and after the War used the name Rudolph Anders. His German-accented English confined him largely to "accent roles", and during World War II to villain parts, although not leading roles as his small build, wide eyes, soft voice and naturally quiet demeanor did not allow him to appear overly menacing.

He was naturalized an American citizen in 1934, and was married.  Anders died  in Woodland Hills, Los Angeles, California.

Partial filmography

Ludwig II, King of Bavaria (1930) - Diener (uncredited)
Peter Voss, Thief of Millions (1932)
Primavera en otoño (1933) - Tristán
 When Strangers Marry (1933) - Von Arnheim
Ladies Must Love (1933) - Wallace - Bill's Butler (uncredited)
La ciudad de cartón (1934) - Primer director
Stamboul Quest (1934) - Karl
The Fountain (1934) - Geof Van Leyden
Las fronteras del amor (1934) - Otto Van Ritter
Hell in the Heavens (1934) - Lt. Schroeder
Here's to Romance (1935) - Violinist (uncredited)
I Live My Life (1935) - Minor Role (uncredited)
Rendezvous (1935) - Radio Operator (uncredited)
De la sartén al fuego (1935) - Sargento Groebner
Last of the Pagans (1935) - Superintendent's Assistant (uncredited)
The Golden Arrow (1936) - Lord Max (uncredited)
Girls' Dormitory (1936) - Minor role (uncredited)
We're in the Legion Now! (1936) - Sgt. Groeber
Champagne Waltz (1937) - Emperor Franz Joseph (uncredited)
Thin Ice (1937) - German Reporter (uncredited)
I Met Him in Paris (1937) - Romantic Waiter (scenes deleted)
The Big Broadcast of 1938 (1938) - Bartender (uncredited)
Confessions of a Nazi Spy (1939) - Captain Straubel
Conspiracy (1939) - Machine Gunner (uncredited)
Espionage Agent (1939) - Paul Strawn
Pack Up Your Troubles (1939) - Von Richtman (uncredited)
The Mad Empress (1939) - Herzfeld
Escape to Paradise (1939) - Alexander Komac
Four Sons (1940) - Hempel
The Mortal Storm (1940) - Gestapo Official Hartman (uncredited)
The Man I Married (1940) - Storm Trooper (uncredited)
Knute Rockne All American (1940) - Elder in Norway (uncredited)
The Great Dictator (1940) - Tomanian Commandant at Osterlich
Arise, My Love (1940) - Prussian Officer (uncredited)
Meet the Wildcat (1940) - Feral - Henchman
Mr. Dynamite (1941) - Butler (uncredited)
Shining Victory (1941) - Police Officer Exiling Paul (uncredited)
Underground (1941) - Official (uncredited)
A Dangerous Game (1941) - Dr. Fleming
Down in San Diego (1941) - Henry Schrode
King of the Texas Rangers (1941 serial) - His Excellency (Chs. 1,3,6,10-12)
Nazi Agent (1942) - Cab Driver (uncredited)
To Be or Not to Be (1942) - Gestapo Sergeant at Desk at Top of Hotel Stairs (uncredited)
Spy Smasher (1942 serial) - Dungeon Col. Von Kohr (Ch. 1)
Eagle Squadron (1942) - German Squad Leader (uncredited)
The Phantom Plainsmen (1942) - Colonel Eric Hartwig
Riders of the Northland (1942) - Nazi Agent
The Pied Piper (1942) - Lieutenant
Berlin Correspondent (1942) - Guard at Airport (uncredited)
The Secret Code (1942 serial) - Rudi Thysson
Sherlock Holmes and the Voice of Terror (1942) - Schieler - Nazi at Church (uncredited)
Desperate Journey (1942) - Kruse
Junior Army (1942) - Horner - Nazi Saboteur
The Great Impersonation (1942) - Karl Hofmann
Sherlock Holmes and the Secret Weapon (1942) - Braun (uncredited)
Chetniks! The Fighting Guerrillas (1943) - Mounted Officer (uncredited)
They Got Me Covered (1943) - Gerhardt (uncredited)
Assignment in Brittany (1943) - Orderly (uncredited)
Tonight We Raid Calais (1943) - German Lieutenant
Watch on the Rhine (1943) - Oberdorff
The Strange Death of Adolf Hitler (1943) - Maj. Mampe
The Hitler Gang (1944) - Dr. Stenglein (uncredited)
The Story of Dr. Wassell (1944) - Wounded Dutch Soldier (uncredited)
Counter-Attack (1945) - Stillman
Escape in the Desert (1945) - Hoffman
Under Nevada Skies (1946) - Alberti
Her Sister's Secret (1946) - Birdman
Dangerous Millions (1946) - Rudolph Busch
Act of Violence (1949) - German (voice, uncredited)
Kill or Be Killed (1950) - Gregory Marek
Target Unknown (1951) - Doctor (uncredited)
Actor's and Sin (1952) - Otto Lachsley (segment "Actor's Blood")
Phantom from Space (1953) - Dr. Wyatt
South Sea Woman (1953) - Capt. van Dorck
Captain Scarface (1953) - Dr. Yeager
Magnificent Obsession (1954) - Dr. Fuss
King Richard and the Crusaders (1954) - Austrian Knight (uncredited)
Jungle Gents (1954) - Dr. Goebel
A Star Is Born (1954) - Mr. Ettinger (uncredited)
The Snow Creature (1954) - Dr. Louis Dupont
The Walter Winchell File (1957, Episode: "The Candlestick") - Kalisch
She Demons (1958) - Col. Karl Osler
Frankenstein 1970 (1958) - Wilhelm Gottfried
A Private's Affair (1959) - Dr. Leyden
On the Double (1961) - Oberkommandant
The Pigeon That Took Rome (1962) - Oberst Krafft
The Prize (1963) - Mr. Rolfe Bergh
Decision at Midnight (1963) - Uncle
36 Hours (1965) - Dr. Winterstein (uncredited)

References
Halliwell, Alfred, Halliwell's Filmgoer's Companion

External links

1895 births
1987 deaths
German male film actors
German emigrants to the United States
20th-century German male actors
20th-century American male actors
People from Emmendingen (district)